Pan Borneo Highway, also known as Trans-Borneo Highway or Trans-Kalimantan Highway, is a road network on Borneo Island connecting two Malaysian states, Sabah and Sarawak, with Brunei and Kalimantan region in Indonesia. The highway is numbered AH150 in the Asian Highway Network and as Federal Route 1 in Sarawak. In Sabah, the route numbers given are 1, 13 and 22. The highway is a joint project between both governments which started as soon as the formation of Malaysia in 1963 which comprised Malaya, Sabah, Sarawak and Singapore. The lack of a road network system in Sarawak was the main factor of the construction.

The Indonesian sections of the Pan Borneo Highway is known as the Trans-Kalimantan Highway. The western route connects the city of Pontianak to Tebedu.

Route background 

The Pan-Borneo Highway, Asian Highway Route AH150 is supposed to be a circular highway that runs along the coastlines of Sabah, Sarawak, Brunei and Kalimantan. However, a missing link does exist from Serudong, Sabah to Simanggaris, North Kalimantan, which is supposed to connect Sabah with North Kalimantan.

The Malaysian section of the Pan-Borneo Highway is signposted as Federal Route 1 in Sarawak and Federal Routes 1, 22 and 13 in Sabah. The 1,077-km highway in Sarawak is divided to 92 sections altogether, and the sections are sometimes being signposted along with the route number with the syntax of xx-yy, where xx is the route number and yy is the section code. In Brunei, the highway is signposted simply as the AH150.

In Kalimantan, the Trans-Kalimantan Highway consists of three main highways. The northern route, also dubbed as Trans Border Highway (Jalan Lintas Perbatasan), runs along the Malaysia-Indonesia border from Tamajuk to Sei Ular. The central route runs from Pontianak to Samarinda through the interior of Kalimantan. The southern route, which runs along the coastline of Kalimantan from Sambas to Simanggaris, is gazetted as the Indonesian section of the Asian Highway Route AH150. None of the three highways bear any route number yet.

The Malaysian and Indonesian sections are linked together by a highway known as the Trans-Malindo Highway (Jalan Lintas Malindo), which is gazetted as Federal Route 21 in Malaysia.

History 
The Pan-Borneo Highway was built due to the lack of the intercity highway network in the island of Borneo. In East Malaysia, the intercity highway plan only existed after the Second World War ended in 1945, after the states of North Borneo (Sabah) and Sarawak were ceded to Britain to become British Crown Colonies.

The construction of the intercity highway network in Sabah and Sarawak intensified at a faster pace after both states participated in the Federation of Malaysia in 1963. In Sabah, the first federally-funded intercity highway project ever constructed was the Federal Route 22 from Kota Kinabalu to Sandakan, as a joint project between the Malaysian federal government with the government of Australia. Also dubbed as the "Malaysia-Australia Road Project" (MARP), the construction of the FT22 highway began in 1968 and was completed in 1982 with Telupid town became the main centre of the project headquarters.

In the meantime, the Kota Kinabalu–Papar section of the Federal Route 1 was completed in 1964, followed by the Kota Kinabalu–Kudat section which was completed in the 1970s. The entire Sabah Federal Route 1 was completed in 1981 after the construction of the final section from Papar to Sindumin was completed that year. Two years later in 1983, the construction of the Tawau–Semporna Highway (part of the FT13 highway and the entire section of the SA51 highway) was completed. The construction of the remaining section of the FT13 highway was completed in the early 1990s after the construction of Sungai Kinabatangan and Sungai Segama bridges were completed.

Meanwhile, in Sarawak, the construction of the first intercity trunk highway in Sarawak was commenced in 1965, dubbed as the "First Trunk Road". Most of the highway network in Sarawak was constructed within the decades of the 1960s to 1980s. The Lawas–Merapok–Sindumin section was completed in 1981 while the final missing link from Sibu to Bintulu was completed in 1985. However, the highway had not been fully paved with asphalt yet at that time; it was only by the end of Sixth Malaysia Plan (RMK6) in 1995 that the FT1 highway in Sarawak was fully paved.

Before 1996, all routes in the Pan-Borneo Highway network in Malaysia were state highways. After the Federal Roads Act 1959 was made effective in Sabah and Sarawak in 1984, those highways were re-gazetted as federal highways in 1996 with the route number of FT1 (from Sematan to Kudat through Brunei), FT13 (Mile 32 Sandakan to Tawau) and FT22 (Tamparuli to Sandakan). Those highways were later gazetted as a part of Asian Highway Network Route AH150.

Meanwhile, the road transportation network in Kalimantan region did not exist until the 1970s when logging roads were built by logging companies. Later, about 75% of the logging roads were converted to national roads. The Trans-Kalimantan Highway (southern route) was completed in 2016 with the opening of the Tayan Bridge.

Although some sections had been upgraded to divided highways, the Pan-Borneo Highway was notorious for its poor condition in many sections. ,  of the Indonesian Trans-Kalimantan Highway was built below the Asian Highway Network Class III standards (lane width: 3.0 m; design speed limit: 80 km/h). Meanwhile, the overall condition in many sections of the Malaysian section of the Highway was poor with many potholes, because most sections of the highway were built with standards as low as JKR R3 (design speed limit: 70 km/h; minimum lane width: 3.0 m). A study to upgrade the entire highway to a super two highway under JKR R5 standard (design speed limit: 100 km/h; minimum lane width: 3.5 m) was done, which was expected to cost RM16 billion. Ultimately, the Malaysian federal government had opted to upgrade the Pan-Borneo Highway to a divided highway. The upgrade works of the Pan-Borneo Highway to a divided highway is expected to be completed by 2023 for the Sarawakian section and by 2025 for the Sabahan section, with the overall cost of RM27 billion.

Intersections along the Pan Borneo Highway 
 Malaysia Federal Route 1 (Sarawak)#List of interchanges, intersections and towns
 Brunei Pan-Borneo Highway#List of interchanges, intersections and towns
 Malaysia Federal Route 1 (Sabah)#List of interchanges
Kimanis-Keningau Highway#List of interchanges
 Malaysia Federal Route 22#List of interchanges
 Malaysia Federal Route 13 (Sabah)#List of interchanges

Pan Borneo Highway Sabah 
UEM, MMC and Warisan Tarang Construction Sdn Bhd is teaming up, forms UEM-MMC-Warisan Tarang JV Sdn Bhd via a joint venture (JV) and received their role as project delivery partner (PDP) via Borneo Highway PDP (BHP) Sdn Bhd in 2016. Warisan Tarang owns BHP. It starts at Sindumin and ends at Serudong. In 2019, UEM announces that UEM-MMC-Warisan Tarang JV Sdn Bhd agrees the Pakatan Harapan government's decision to terminate their role as PDP. Since then, the joint venture company would gave up their operation and gives the project to other contractors to continue. This has caused the Sabah Pan Borneo Highway project to be disrupted in the long run until September 2020.

In October 2020, new Sabahan government was established under GRS Party defeating Warisan Party in state election. The leaders of GRS Party announced that the Sabah Pan Borneo Highway will be restarted again and will not terminated the process until the Pan Borneo projects successfully done.

Pan Borneo Highway Sarawak 
In 2015, then Prime Minister Najib Razak and then Chief Minister, Adenan Satem launched the Pan Borneo Highway project in Telok Melano. The main purpose was to upgrade the two-way lane to four lane two-way lane. 50 years ago, long-distance travelling was the only way through the two way and it was unhappy news for those who traveled to other parts of the state for working abroad and holiday seasons. It was Adenan's manifesto to upgrade the state's infrastructure. 10 contractors were involved in this project, beginning with Samlig Resources Sdn Bhd for works package (WPC01) which connects Telok Melano and Sematan in December 2015 as the first contractor and ended with Konsortium KPE Sdn Bhd for Sg. Tangap to Pujut Link Road in July 2016 as among the last contractors to do so. The length of this project was almost 10,000 km and the cost was near RM1 billion. Of all the projects, WPC01 Telok Melano to Sematan was the shortest length (32.77 km) while WPC02 Sematan to Sg. Moyan was the longest length (95.43 km), both went by Samling and there are 24 interchanges built at the each of projects, consists WPC02 (Bau, Lundu, Mile 10, Mile 7, Mile 6 & Mile 4 1/2), WPC03 (Serian 1, Serian 2 & Simunjan), WPC04 (Sri Aman), WPC05 (Betong), WPC06 (Sarikei & Bintangor), WPC07 (Julau & Sibu), WPC08 (Selangau), WPC10 (Nyabau, Suai, Niah & Bakun) & WPC11 (Miri Airport, Bekenu, Beluru & Pujut Link). Contractors involved are:

 Samling Group of Companies (via Samling Resources Sdn Bhd) 
 Zecon Berhad
 Kimlun Corporation Bhd
 Naim Holdings Berhad
 Gamuda Berhad Endaya Construction Sdn Bhd
 TRC Synergy Berhad
 Pembinaan Kuantiti Sdn Bhd
 Cahya Mata Sarawak (via PPES Works (Sarawak) Sdn Bhd (PPESW)) 
 Bina Puri, via Bina Puri Sdn Bhd (BPSB) 
 Hock Seng Lee Berhad (HSL) 
 Dhaya Maju Infrastructure (Asia) Sdn Bhd (DMIA) 
 Musyati Sdn Bhd
Mudajaya Group Berhad
 KKB Engineering Berhad
 WCT Holdings Berhad
 Shin Yang Group of Companies (via Pekerjaan Piasau Konkerit Sdn Bhd)  
 Konsortium KPE Sdn Bhd (a 70:30 JV company of KACC Construction Sdn Bhd and Perbena Emas Sdn Bhd) 

It was conducted by Lebuhraya Borneo Utara (LBU) Sdn Bhd as a turnkey contractor. Samling Resources Sdn Bhd and Pekerjaan Piasau Konkerit Sdn Bhd (PPK) takes the two projects, WPCs 01 & 02 connects Telok Melano and Sg. Moyan & WPC10 Bintulu Airport Junction to Sg. Tangap + Kick-Off Project Nyabau to Bakun Junction. In January 2019, the first package, Telok Melano to Sematan was complete and the main contractor, Samling Resources Sdn Bhd hands the completed road to the government to ease the Telok Melano residents to start their new trips to Sematan, Lundu, Bau, Kuching and vice versa via KM0.00, Telok Melano and ends at Sematan Roundabout, which is still in construction in WPC02 which connects Sematan and Sg. Moyan. The roundabout was included in this project and was nearer to SMK Sematan. It was launched by Works Minister, Baru Bian and Chief Minister, Abang Johari Tun Openg. At the same year, the 
kick-off project (KOP) Nyabau to Bakun Junction was completed and officially opened at 14 October by the representators of Sarawak Public Works Department, LBU, state government and the main contractor, Pekerjaan Piasau Konkerit Sdn Bhd. In 2020, LBU's status as Project Delivery Partner (PDP) was terminated by then Pakatan Harapan government prior to their collapse and Malaysian Public Works Department or Jabatan Kerja Raya (JKR) takes over the project at the same time.

The contractors were divided into different WPCs:
Samling Resources Sdn Bhd - WPC01 Telok Melano to Sematan (TMS) & WPC02 Sematan to Sg. Moyan (SSM) + KSR Interchanges
Zecon Kimlun JV Consortium Sdn Bhd - WPC03 Serian Roundabout to Pantu Junction (SPJ)
Naim Gamuda JV Sdn Bhd - WPC04 Pantu Junction to Batang Skrang (PJS)
Endaya - TRC - PK JV Sdn Bhd - WPC05 Batang Skrang to Sg. Awik (SSA)
PPESW BPSB JV Sdn Bhd - WPC06 Sg. Awik to Bintangor Junction (SAB)
HSL DMIA JV Sdn Bhd - WPC07 Bintangor Junction to Sg. Kua Bridge (BSK)
Musyati Mudajaya JV Sdn Bhd - WPC08 Sg. Kua Bridge to Sg. Arip Bridge (SKB)
KKBWCT Joint Venture Sdn Bhd - WPC09 Sg. Arip Bridge to Bintulu Airport Junction (ABJ)
Pekerjaan Piasau Konkerit Sdn Bhd - WPC10 Bintulu Airport Junction to Sg. Tangap (Nyabau Interchange) (BJT) + Kick-Off Project (KOP) Nyabau to Bakun Junction
Konsortium KPE Sdn Bhd - WPC11 Sg. Tangap to Pujut Link Road (TPL)

In 2021, the new Durin Bridge's parallel was opened to public, as well as Serian 1 & 2, and Mile 4 1/2 Interchanges, the first flyover to be so. Julau Interchange, one of two flyovers in Sibu, were opened to public as well as new 4 lane road towards Durin Bridge. In 2022, Nyabau Interchange, the longest flyover, opened to public. At the same year, Interchanges of Mile 7 and 6 in Kuching, Miri Airport and Pujut Link opened to public as well as new 4 lane road towards Permyjaya in Miri.

See also 
 Malaysian Federal Roads system

References

External links 
 
 Sabah Pan-Borneo Highway
 Sarawak Pan-Borneo Highway
 

 
Roads and Highways in Brunei
Indonesian National Routes